Rotoroa Island is an island to the east of Waiheke Island in the Hauraki Gulf of New Zealand. The Salvation Army purchased it for £400 in 1908 from the Ruthe family to expand their alcohol and drug rehabilitation facility at nearby Pakatoa Island. Men were treated at Home Bay at Rotoroa, while women were treated at Pakatoa. This treatment facility was closed in 2005.

In 2008, philanthropists Neal and Annette Plowman negotiated a 99-year lease from the Salvation Army, establishing the Rotoroa Island Trust, and created a programme of restoration and redevelopment, designed to return island access to the people of New Zealand. Rotoroa Island opened to the public for the first time in over 100 years in February 2011.

The Rotoroa Island Museum opened in 2009.

Conservation

The Rotoroa island Trust’s vision is for the island to become a sanctuary where people can experience the wonder of New Zealand wildlife.

Auckland Zoo helped Rotoroa’s conservation team to identify species suitable for translocation to the island. These include takahē, pāteke (brown teal), tīeke (saddleback) and North Island brown kiwi.

Kiwi 
Rotoroa Island is a creche site for Coromandel brown kiwi. Kiwi left in the wild have about a 5% survival rate, the process of taking kiwi chicks to creche sites is known as Operation Nest Egg run by Kiwis for kiwi and brings survival rates to 50-60%. The tiny chicks are released on Rotoroa Island when they are just a few weeks old, weighing 250-300g and are able to grow up in the safety of the island. Every two years, Rotoroa Island does a kiwi muster for adult birds. Weighing about 1kg, the mature kiwi are better able to defend themselves against predators such as stoats and feral cats. Some are returned to the Coromandel, while others are taken to nearby Motutapu Island to establish a new population.

Takahē 
Rotoroa is one of ten smaller sanctuary sites working with the Department of Conservation on takahē recovery. The island has operated as a “creche” for takahē chicks since 2015. The Takahē Recovery Programme is managed by the Department of Conservation (DoC) with the aim of protecting and promoting population growth for this endangered species of large, flightless bird – whose current official population is 418 (as of 2020). More than 70 years ago takahē were thought to be extinct.

Other endangered wildlife 
More than 9 little pāteke chicks have hatched in the 2020 season.  These small dabbling ducks were once found throughout New Zealand but are now considered to be the rarest waterfowl on the mainland with an estimated population of around 2,000-2,500. Tīeke/saddleback population has more than doubled between March 2015 - Oct 2019.

Restoration programme  
 Removing 22,000 pine trees 
 Planting over 400,000 native New Zealand trees – over 25 different species (including 30,000 pōhutukawa)
 After an extensive pest eradication programme, Rotoroa Island was pronounced predator free in 2014. This is one of the most successful eradications in New Zealand, removing over 300,000 mice through aerial bait drops.
 Currently Rotoroa Island has over 50 traps (doC 200) and 50 tracking tunnels as part of biosecurity monitoring.
 Restoring 3 holiday homes and a shared hostel accommodation, enabling public to stay overnight. 
 Developing a museum by architect Rick Pearson which includes an exhibition on the island’s history. 
 Commissioning a significant sculpture by NZ artist, Chris Booth; located at the island’s southern point.

Flora 
Kauri seedlings were donated to the trust and have since been planted in the forest above Ladies Bay wetlands. 

Rotoroa Island is a carbon neutral island — all the trees planted are calculated to remove twice the carbon emitted.

See also

 List of islands of New Zealand
 List of islands
 Desert island

References

External links 

Islands of the Hauraki Gulf
Islands of the Auckland Region
Uninhabited islands of New Zealand
Former populated places in New Zealand